James Verbicky (born June 20, 1973) is an abstract mixed media artist currently living in Southern California.

Early life
James Verbicky was born in Edmonton, Alberta, of Polish descent, and later lived in Calgary, Alberta, Victoria, and Vancouver, British Columbia.

Career
In 2002, Verbicky packed his vintage 1963 Pontiac Catalina with artwork and drove from British Columbia, Canada, to Southern California. He struggled for many years with gaining legal status in the U.S., and in 2008, he was finally awarded the "Extraordinary Ability Greencard" (for foreign nationals with extraordinary ability in sciences, arts, education, business, or athletics) by the U.S. Government.

Verbicky was first recognized in California for a commissioned work created on a vintage Frank Gehry sphere originally housed in the Hollywood Bowl. In 2008, he was invited to join the juried exhibition of the Société Nationale des Beaux Arts (SNBA) at the Carrousel du Louvre in the Louvre in Paris, France. Verbicky was among only twelve American-based artists invited to join the SNBA show, which had been in existence for over a hundred years but had only the year before began accepting American (or American-based) delegates. Verbicky exhibited "Awake Concrete" in December 2008 at the Louvre Museum.

Verbicky's work is exhibited widely in galleries around the U.S. and abroad. His collectors include the Tisch family, television personality Dr. Phil, Calvin Klein Supermodel Lara Stone, actors Cameron Mathison, Jon Cryer, Jane Kaczmarek, and the Frank Sinatra Estate in Northridge.

In 2010 Verbicky unveiled a new collection of three-dimensional sculptural paintings which deviate from his established expressionistic past and explore a more conceptual, yet still abstract, style. This latest collection, dubbed 'the media paintings' are pioneered by the "Citta Samtana" series (sanskrit words which translate loosely into "mental continuum" or mindstream). These works are constructed from antique and vintage paper and magazines from all over the world, and intend to communicate and capture cultural bombardment of media throughout the decades.

Awards and accolades

– Granted "Extraordinary Ability Green Card" by the U.S. government.
– Invitation, the Société Nationale des Beaux-Arts (SNBA) at the Louvre, Paris, France.

References
 Luxe Magazine
 Verbicky to Show at the Louvre
 Verbicky in the Astoria
 The Beacon Interviews James Verbicky
 Verbicky on Artslant
 Article by Lauren Simon for Laguna Beach Magazine (pdf)
 La Jolla Light Article 2008
 James Verbicky on ArtNet
 James Verbicky on Artsy
 The Fine Print Magazine Profile

External links
 James Verbicky's official website
 GE Galeria, Mexico City / Monterry, Mexico 
 Madison Gallery, La Jolla, CA
 Imago Galleries, Palm Beach, CA
 Gilman Contemporary, Sun Valley, ID
 Kostuik Gallery, Vancouver, B.C. Canada
 DTR Modern Galleries, Boston/New York/Palm Beach/Washington DC
 1st Dibs
 Verbicky on Artsy 
 Laguna Art Museum
 Verbicky on Artnet
 James Verbicky Works on ArtBrokerage.com
 Coral Springs Museum Exhibition 2015

Abstract expressionist artists
1973 births
Living people
20th-century Canadian painters
Canadian male painters
21st-century Canadian painters
Painters from California
Canadian conceptual artists
Modern artists
Canadian contemporary painters
Canadian mixed media artists
Minimalist artists
20th-century Canadian male artists
21st-century Canadian male artists
Canadian people of Polish descent